Vartan Malakian (Armenian: Վարդան Մալաքյան, born February 14, 1947) is an Iraqi-Armenian-American artist and painter. He is the father of Daron Malakian, the guitarist and co-founder of System of a Down and Scars on Broadway.

See also
 Armenian art
 List of Armenian artists
 Iraqi art
 List of Iraqi artists

References

1947 births
20th-century American painters
American sculptors
Armenian painters
American people of Armenian descent
Armenian sculptors
Iraqi people of Armenian descent
Iraqi emigrants to the United States
Iraqi painters
Iraqi sculptors
Living people
People from Mosul
21st-century American painters